Mereto di Tomba is a comune (municipality) in the Province of Udine in the Italian region Friuli-Venezia Giulia, located about  northwest of Trieste and about  west of Udine.

Mereto di Tomba borders the following municipalities: Basiliano, Codroipo, Coseano, Fagagna, San Vito di Fagagna, Sedegliano and Pasian di Prato.

Twin towns
Mereto di Tomba is twinned with:

  Oppeano, Italy

References

Cities and towns in Friuli-Venezia Giulia